The 1878 Oxford University by-election was fought on 13–17 May 1878.  The byelection was fought due to the elevation to the peerage of the incumbent Conservative MP, Gathorne Hardy.  It was won by the Conservative candidate John Gilbert Talbot.

References

1878 elections in the United Kingdom
1878 in England
19th century in Oxfordshire
May 1878 events
By-elections to the Parliament of the United Kingdom in Oxford University